The Estadi Olímpic de Terrassa is a stadium in Terrassa, Catalonia, Spain.  It is currently used for football matches and is the home stadium of Terrassa FC.  The stadium holds 11,500 spectators.

The venue hosted the field hockey competitions for the 1992 Summer Olympics. Built in 1955, it was renovated in 1991 for those games. It was also used in a friendly match between the Catalonia national football team and Costa Rica on May 24, 2006, in which Catalonia won 2–0. The stadium will be one of the hosts of the 2022 Women's FIH Hockey World Cup.

It will be home of the Barcelona Dragons in the 2023 European League of Football season.

External links
Stadium featured on Blog

References

1992 Summer Olympics official report. Volume 2. pp. 298–302.
Stadium information

Sports venues completed in 1955
Venues of the 1992 Summer Olympics
Football venues in Catalonia
Olympic field hockey venues
Field hockey venues in Spain
Estadi Olimpic de Terrassa
Estadi Olimpic de Terrassa
1955 establishments in Spain